Ernest Vaast (28 October 1922 – ) was a French international football midfielder. He scored 11 goals in 15 matches for France and was a main player at RC Paris.

References

External links
 
 

1922 births
2011 deaths
French footballers
France international footballers
Footballers from Paris
Association football midfielders
Racing Club de France Football players
Servette FC players
Stade Rennais F.C. players
Red Star F.C. players
Ligue 1 players
French football managers
AS Cherbourg Football managers
Rodez AF managers